William Hugh Elliot-Murray-Kynynmound, 3rd Earl of Minto (19 March 1814 – 17 March 1891), was a British Whig politician.  He was the eldest son of Gilbert Elliot-Murray-Kynynmound, 2nd Earl of Minto.

From 1814 until his accession in 1859, he was styled Viscount Melgund.

He was educated at Eton and Trinity College, Cambridge.

He was elected as the member of parliament (MP) for Hythe at a by-election in May 1837, and held the seat until the 1841 general election, when he stood unsuccessfully in Rochester.

At the 1847 general election, he was returned as MP for Greenock. He held that seat until the 1852 general election, when he contested Glasgow without success. He was returned for Clackmannanshire and Kinross-shire at the 1857 general election, but did not stand again in 1859.

He was made a Knight of the Thistle in 1870.

He died in 1891, aged 76, two days short of his 77th birthday.

Family
He married Emma, daughter of General Sir Thomas Hislop, 1st Baronet and their children included William and Gilbert Elliot-Murray-Kynynmound, 4th Earl of Minto.

References

External links 
 

1814 births
1891 deaths
Earls in the Peerage of the United Kingdom
Knights of the Thistle
Elliot-Murray-Kynynmound, Gilbert
Elliot-Murray-Kynynmound, Gilbert
Elliot-Murray-Kynynmound, Gilbert
Elliot-Murray-Kynynmound, Gilbert
Elliot-Murray-Kynynmound, Gilbert
Elliot-Murray-Kynynmound, Gilbert
Elliot-Murray-Kynynmound, Gilbert
UK MPs who inherited peerages
People educated at Eton College
Alumni of Trinity College, Cambridge